Wang Ki-Chun (Hangul: 왕기춘, ; born September 13, 1988 in Jeongeup, Jeollabuk-do) is a former judoka from South Korea.

He became known for beating the 2004 Olympic champion Lee Won-Hee in the qualification matches for the 2007 World Championships and the 2008 Olympic Games.

Wang won the world title at the age of 19 at the 2007 World Championships in Rio de Janeiro, Brazil.

He was the favorite for winning the gold medal in the 2008 Olympic Games, however, Wang suffered ribcage fracture when Brazil's Leandro Guilheiro hit him with an elbow in the quarterfinal. Despite fighting through injury, Wang was beaten in the final by Elnur Mammadli from Azerbaijan and had to settle for silver medal. He made up for it in the 2009 World Judo Championships by winning the 73 kg final against North Korean Kim Chol-Su.

After winning the Grand Slam in Paris 2010 he did not compete until the 2010 World Championships Tokyo and lost to Hiroyuki Akimoto in the semi-finals and had to settle with the bronze.

He did not medal at the 2011 World Championships in Paris, crashing out early to Ugo Legrand of France. He faced him again in the 2012 Summer Olympics in the fight for bronze, losing again.

In his prime, Wang was known for his physical fighting style, and his deadly tai otoshi and seoi nage.

Disciplinary issues 
In 2009, Wang assaulted a female club patron, slapping her face after an altercation. No charges were pressed after he reached a settlement with the victim.

Wang was in controversy again in 2014, when he was detained for eight days by the Republic of Korea Army's military police for using his mobile phone while serving his national service. He was caught using his phone again a week later, and was sent to the military correctional facility.

On May 2, 2020, Wang was arrested on charges of sexually assaulting a minor. The Daegu District Court sentenced him to 6 years in prison. The Korea Judo Association subsequently banned Wang for life from judo following the charges for greatly damaging the integrity and social standing of judo.

References

External links
 
 Videos of Wang Ki-Chun (judovision.org)

1988 births
Living people
Judoka at the 2008 Summer Olympics
Judoka at the 2012 Summer Olympics
Olympic judoka of South Korea
Olympic silver medalists for South Korea
Olympic medalists in judo
Asian Games medalists in judo
World judo champions
Medalists at the 2008 Summer Olympics
Judoka at the 2010 Asian Games
South Korean male judoka
Asian Games silver medalists for South Korea
Medalists at the 2010 Asian Games
Universiade medalists in judo
Universiade gold medalists for South Korea
Medalists at the 2013 Summer Universiade
Medalists at the 2015 Summer Universiade
People from Jeongeup
AfreecaTV streamers
Sportspeople from North Jeolla Province
21st-century South Korean people